Rouergue is a former province of France, corresponding roughly with the modern department of Aveyron. Its historical capital is Rodez. It is bounded on the north by Auvergne, on the south and southwest by Languedoc, on the east by Gévaudan and on the west by Quercy.

During the Middle Ages Rouergue changed hands a number of times; its rulers included England (due to the Treaty of Brétigny in 1360), Armagnac and Languedoc.

Rouergue became a department in 1790, and was renamed Aveyron after the principal river flowing through it. Upon creation of the department of Tarn-et-Garonne in 1808, the canton of Saint-Antonin-Noble-Val was detached from the western extremity of Aveyron and transferred to the new department.

At the 1999 census there were 269,774 inhabitants on the territory of the province of Rouergue, for a density of only . The largest urban areas are Rodez, with 38,458 inhabitants in 1999; Millau, with 22,840 inhabitants in 1999; Decazeville, with 17,044 inhabitants in 1999; and Villefranche-de-Rouergue, with 12,561 inhabitants in 1999.

See also
Count of Rouergue
Count of Toulouse

References

 
Former provinces of France
Guyenne
Geography of Aveyron
Geography of Lot (department)
Geography of Tarn-et-Garonne
History of Occitania (administrative region)
History of Aveyron
History of Lot (department)
History of Tarn-et-Garonne